Claudio Pollio (born 27 May 1958 in Naples) is an Italian wrestler and Olympic champion in Freestyle wrestling.

Olympics
Pollio competed at the 1980 Summer Olympics in Moscow where he received a gold medal in Freestyle wrestling, the light flyweight class.

References

1958 births
Living people
Sportspeople from Naples
Olympic wrestlers of Italy
Wrestlers at the 1976 Summer Olympics
Wrestlers at the 1980 Summer Olympics
Italian male sport wrestlers
Olympic gold medalists for Italy
Olympic medalists in wrestling
Medalists at the 1980 Summer Olympics
20th-century Italian people
21st-century Italian people